Shamuleh (also Romanized as Shamūleh; also known as Shamūlā) is a village in Gavork-e Sardasht Rural District, in the Central District of Sardasht County, West Azerbaijan Province, Iran. At the 2006 census, its population was 148, in 24 families.

References 

Populated places in Sardasht County